Mattawan High School is a public high school in Mattawan, Michigan. It is the only high school in the Mattawan Consolidated School District and serves grades 9-12.

Athletics
Mattawan High School's Wildcats compete in the Southwestern Michigan Athletic Conference. School colors are blue and gold. The following Michigan High School Athletic Association (MHSAA) sanctioned sports are offered:

Baseball (boys) 
Basketball (girls and boys) 
Bowling (girls and boys) 
Competitive cheerleading (girls) 
Cross country (girls and boys) 
Football (boys) 
Golf (girls and boys) 
Ice hockey (boys)
Lacrosse (girls and boys) 
Skiing (girls and boys) 
Soccer (girls and boys) 
Softball (girls) 
Swim and dive (girls and boys) 
Tennis (girls and boys) 
Track and field (girls and boys) 
Volleyball (girls) 
Wrestling (boys)

Notable alumni
 Marian and Vivian Brown: Class of 1945 – Actress – aka "The San Francisco Twins"
 Noah Herron: Class of 2000 – College Football Northwestern University – Professional Football - the Pittsburgh Steelers, Green Bay Packers, Tampa Bay Buccaneers, New York Jets, and Cleveland Browns.
 Margaret O'Brien - Member of the Michigan Senate (2015-2018)<> and Michigan House of Representatives (2011-2014). Current Secretary of the Michigan Senate (2019-current)

References

External links

Mattawan Consolidated School
http://legislature.mi.gov/documents/2011-2012/michiganmanual/2011-MM-P0295-p0300.pdf
http://legislature.mi.gov/documents/2015-2016/michiganmanual/2015-MM-P0231-P0236.pdf

Public high schools in Michigan
Educational institutions established in 1911
Schools in Van Buren County, Michigan
1911 establishments in Michigan